

Wins, Leaders and Race Competition

Race Average Finishing Speeds

Qualifications

Pole Position

He, however, crashed on his second lap, and did not complete the four-lap qualifying run.

Miscellenia
1913: Jules Goux is the first winner to go the full race distance without a relief driver, and is both the first French and European victor. Goux's Peugeot entry is the first to win using wire wheels instead of wooden-spoke wheels.
1915: Ralph DePalma is the first Italian-born victor.
1919: Victory by state native Howdy Wilcox prompts crowd to sing Back Home Again in Indiana for the first time, immediately after conclusion of the race. Wilcox's Peugeot is owned and entered by the Indianapolis Motor Speedway, the first winning entry to be directly affiliated with the facility itself.
1920: Gaston Chevrolet is killed in a race at Beverly Hills and is the first '500' winner to die.
1921: Howdy Wilcox is the first driver to finish in first and last place (1919 & 1921).
1923: Jimmy Murphy is the first defending winner to lead the first lap.
1929: Cliff Woodbury is the first pole winner to finish last (crash on lap 3).
1936: Louis Meyer becomes the first driver to drink milk in victory lane. He also becomes the first driver to receive the pace car for his winning effort. The Borg-Warner Trophy makes its first appearance.
1946: George Robson is the first English-born victor.
1948: The Speedway institutes its own 'Safety Patrol' to replace the Indiana National Guard as policing force for the event, which had served in such capacity since the inaugural race.
1949: Local station WTTV provides television coverage of the race during competition for the first time.
1950: Walt Faulkner becomes the first rookie to qualify for the pole position.
1952: Art Cross becomes the first Rookie of the Year. The Indianapolis Motor Speedway Radio Network broadcasts flag-to-flag coverage of the race for the first time.
1958: The front row drivers (Dick Rathmann, Ed Elisian and Jimmy Reece) fail to lead a lap, the only time this has occurred to date.
1965: Jim Clark is the first former World Drivers' Champion to win the race, the first driver to win the race en route to winning the Formula 1 World Championship and the first Scottish victor.
1966: Rookie Graham Hill, the first English-born victor, wins the race but not the Rookie of the Year award (instead awarded to teammate Jackie Stewart), the only time this has occurred to date.  Jim Clark is the first driver to spin and recover twice in the same race.
1971: Bettie Cadou becomes the first female  reporter to be given a silver credential badge that permits access to the pit and garage areas.
1974: The Speedway rescinds its "never on a Sunday" policy, altering a tradition dating to 1911; the race is scheduled to be run, for the first time, on the Sunday before the national observance of Memorial Day, the last Monday of May.
1978: The timing and scoring computer system designed by Arthur W Graham III (Indianapolis 500 Director) was first used to accurately track drivers times and simultaneously display race leaders and laps.
1980: Tom Sneva becomes the first driver to lead the race after starting from dead last, finishing 2nd.
1983: Al Unser and son Al Unser Jr. are the first father and son to compete together in the same race.
1984: Michael Andretti becomes the first son of a previous Rookie of the Year award winner (Mario Andretti, 1965) to win the award himself, shared with Colombian Roberto Guerrero.
1986: ABC Sports provides flag-to-flag television coverage for the first time.
1988: Bill Vukovich III becomes the first third-generation driver to qualify and drive in the race, following his two-time winning grandfather and once second-place finishing father.
1992: Al Unser Jr. becomes the first second-generation winner of the race, following his four-time winning father.
2002: Hélio Castroneves becomes the first rookie winner to become a multiple-race winner.
2005: Danica Patrick becomes the first female driver to lead the race, for a total of 19 laps.
2006: Marco Andretti becomes the first third-generation winner of the Rookie of the Year award (Mario Andretti, 1965; Michael Andretti, co-1984).
2007: First Indy 500 race with three women competing in the field (Duno, Fisher, Patrick); also the first race where two women were running at the completion of the event (Fisher, Patrick).
2009: First Indy 500 race where three females finished the race, (Duno, Fisher, Patrick). Also the highest finish for a woman, 3rd(Patrick).
2010: First Indy 500 race with four women competing in the field (Fisher, Patrick, Silvestro, Beatriz); The Rookie of the year it was for the Swiss driver (Silvestro).
2017: Takuma Sato of Japan becomes the first Asian-born victor.
2018: Will Power of Australia becomes the first Australian-born victor.
2019: First Indy 500 race broadcast by NBC Sports.
2020: First Indy 500 to be run in August.
2021: First Indy 500 to have at least 30 cars running at the finish.

References
Indianapolis 500 Chronicle, John Pope, copyright 1999
2005 Indianapolis 500-Mile Race Program
2006 Indianapolis 500-Mile Race Program

Firsts